The Power of Darkness is a 1979 Argentine mystery-horror thriller film written and directed by Mario Sábato and starring Sergio Renán. It is based on the chapter named Informe sobre ciegos ("Report on the Blind"), from the novel On Heroes and Tombs, written by the father of the director, Ernesto Sábato. It was nominated for Best Film at the International Fantasy Film Award Fantasporto in 1982.

The film can be read as a clear metaphor for the State terrorism and violence produced by the military dictatorship that ruled Argentina at the time, the self-titled "National Reorganization Process" (1976–1983).

Synopsis 
A man (Renán) has discovered a global conspiracy made by blind people, but can not prove or convince others. So he decides to write a report for the record, in case something happens. The film takes place in dark places, during the night, such as subways and basements.

Cast 
 Sergio Renán
 Osvaldo Terranova
 Carlos Antón
 Christina Banegas
 Aldo Barbero
 Leonor Benedetto
 Rodolfo Brindisi
 Franklin Caicedo
 Jorge De La Riestra
 Graciela Dufau
 Enrique Fava
 Valentina Fernández De Rosa
 Augusto Larreta
 Carlos Moreno
 Nelly Prono

References

External links 
 

1979 films
1970s Spanish-language films
Argentine mystery thriller films
1970s mystery thriller films
Films directed by Mario Sábato
Films set in Buenos Aires
Films shot in Buenos Aires
1970s Argentine films